Top and Bottom Brass is an album by trumpeter Clark Terry featuring performances recorded in early 1959 and originally released on the Riverside label.

Reception

Scott Yanow of Allmusic says, "Terry is in fine form on a variety of blues, originals and obscurities along with the interesting versions of "My Heart Belongs to Daddy" and "A Sunday Kind of Love" but the results overall are not all that significant".

Track listing
All compositions by Clark Terry except as indicated
 "Mili-Terry" - 4:19   
 "The Swinging Chemise" (Duke Ellington) - 6:58   
 "My Heart Belongs to Daddy" (Cole Porter) - 3:13   
 "Blues for Etta" - 7:22   
 "Top 'n' Bottom" - 4:51   
 ""127"" - 8:06   
 "A Sunday Kind of Love" (Barbara Belle, Anita Leonard, Louis Prima, Stan Rhodes) - 3:24   
 "Mardi Gras Waltz" - 4:03

Personnel
Clark Terry - trumpet, flugelhorn
Don Butterfield - tuba
Jimmy Jones - piano
Sam Jones - bass
Art Taylor - drums

References

Riverside Records albums
Clark Terry albums
1959 albums
Albums produced by Orrin Keepnews